China–Ukraine relations are foreign relations between Ukraine and China. The earliest contact in record between the nations date back to the first Russian Orthodox mission in China in 1715, which was led by the Ukrainian Archimandrite Hilarion (Lezhaysky). As part of the Soviet Union, Ukraine  recognized the People's Republic of China in October 1949. After Ukraine gained independence from the Soviet Union in 1991, the two countries built formal diplomatic relations in 1992, and declared a strategic partnership in 2011.

China has an embassy in Kyiv and a Consulate-General in Odesa. Ukraine has an embassy in Beijing and a Consulate-General in Shanghai. According to the Chinese embassy in Ukraine, over 6,000 Chinese citizens work or study in Ukraine. 50,000 to 100,000 Ukrainian citizens live in China, as estimated by the Ukrainian embassy in China, especially in the cities of Beijing, Shanghai and Harbin.

Historical relations 
The historical contact between the Chinese and the Ukrainian can date back to the first Russian Orthodox mission arrived in Beijing, the capital of Qing dynasty of China in 1715. The mission was led by the Ukrainian Archimandrite Hilarion Lezhaysky. The archimandrite was a graduate of the Kyiv-Mohyla Academy, and was a teacher at Chernihiv, before coming to China. Many of his successors in the mission were also from Ukraine, such as Gervasius Lentsovsky who arrived in China in 1742. The fathers also brought back knowledge to Ukraine. Thus, there were a number of original Chinese books found in Kharkiv College founded in 1722. The first-ever Chinese to visit Ukraine in record was the diplomatic mission led by Li Hongzhang who landed Odesa in 1896 and crossed the vast land of the Russian empire before finally arriving in the empire's capital Saint Petersburg. Before the First World War, there were sparse Chinese migrants to Odesa. To fill the manpower shortage caused by casualties during the First World War, it is estimated that six to seven thousand Chinese workers were recruited to Ukraine during the war.

On 24 November 1966, during the UN General Assembly 21st session 2159th meeting, as the Republic of China cited the dual representation of Byelorussia, Ukraine and the Soviet Union to support similar arrangement regarding China, the Ukrainian representative argued against such arrangement and supported expelling the representative of the Republic of China (Taiwan) and transfer of the seat of the People's Republic of China. On 25 October 1972, the Ukrainian representative voted to support the People's Republic of China to take the seat of China. Following the dissolution of the Soviet Union, the People's Republic of China first established relations with Ukraine in 1992.

Political relations 
Since 1991, China–Ukraine relations have been complex. From 1992 to 2004, bilateral relations intensified, resulting in trade, economic, military-technical, scientific, educational, and cultural cooperation and two exchanged state visits. However, after Kyiv allowed a Taiwanese official to visit Ukraine for a meeting by International Crisis Group in 2005, relations deteriorated during the presidency of Viktor Yushchenko (2005-2010). With Viktor Yanukovych elected president in 2010, China revived the political contact with Ukraine, as two countries signed Joint Declaration on Establishment and Development of Strategic Partnership in 2011. However, after the Maidan Revolution, China has kept official contact with Ukraine low-key, considering the protests as western-sponsored.

Nuclear security guarantee 
In a unilateral governmental statement in 1994, China provided Ukraine with nuclear security guarantee, where China states its inclination to peaceful settlement of differences and disputes by way of fair consultations. In December 2013, Ukrainian President Viktor Yanukovych and Chinese Communist Party leader Xi Jinping signed a bilateral treaty and published a joint statement, where China reaffirmed that it will provide Ukraine with nuclear security guarantees upon nuclear invasion or threats of invasion. However, the initial coverage by Xinhua, the Chinese government's official press agency, avoided the term "nuclear umbrella", but said that China is offering Ukraine "security guarantee," though People's Daily, the official newspaper of the Central Committee of the Chinese Communist Party, used the headline "China offers Ukraine nuclear umbrella protection", which has been censored since. According to Wu Dahui, a professor at the Department of International Relations at Tsinghua University in Beijing, the promise is simply a manifestation of Beijing's global nonproliferation responsibilities.

2022 Russian invasion of Ukraine 

When asked whether she would call the war a Russian invasion, China's assistant foreign minister, Hua Chunying, refused to give a clear yes or no answer and instead criticised the West for deteriorating the situation, blaming the US to be "the culprit of current tensions surrounding Ukraine" and reminding the public that the NATO owes China a "debt of blood" since the United States bombing of the Chinese embassy in Belgrade in 1999. The official media also avoided referring to the conflicts as an invasion.

The Chinese ambassador expressed Chinese support for the sovereignty and territorial integrity of Ukraine to the Ukrainian media prior to the war. The Chinese government also does not recognise Russian annexation of Crimea, and has restricted contact with the occupation authorities. China abstained in the related UN Security Council votes. China also implemented the Western-led sanctions, despite criticism against sanctions.

The muddled official responses to the war has led to rare debates over Russian military actions on the social media. As the Ukrainian embassy issued a statement in Chinese condemning Russia on Weibo, the topic soon became the most heated on the platform, with the hashtag "Ukraine issues statement on Weibo" viewed over 300 million times in a day. The governments of the US, the UK, EU countries and Russia also issued statements on Weibo in response to the war. Chinese company NetEase has published anti-war videos from Chinese in Ukraine and Ukrainians in China. However, Beijing's failure to criticise Russia increased local hostility towards stranded Chinese in Ukraine, although Beijing signalled willingness to mediate in the war.

On 17 March 2022, the Chinese Ambassador to Ukraine, Fan Xianrong said that China will support Ukraine both economically and politically.

On 19 March 2022, Ukraine asked China to join Western countries in condemning "Russian brutality," after the US warned China of dire consequences if it aids Moscow's invasion of the country with material support.

In April 2022, The Times reported that days prior to the start of the 2022 Russian invasion of Ukraine, a cyberwarfare unit of the People's Liberation Army launched cyberattacks against hundreds of Ukrainian government sites, according to officials of the Security Service of Ukraine (SBU). The SBU has since denied that it has provided any official information to the media about the incident, disassociated with the conclusions reached by the paper, and stated that it is not investigating and has no information of such an attack.

In May 2022, President Volodymyr Zelensky said that he was satisfied with China's current policy of staying away from the Russian-Ukrainian war, adding that "China has chosen the policy of staying away. At the moment, Ukraine is satisfied with this policy. It is better than helping the Russian Federation in any case. And I want to believe that China will not pursue another policy. We are satisfied with this status quo, to be honest."

In September 2022, Ukrainian parliamentary member Oleksandr Merezhko said China is not an ally of Ukraine, because general secretary of the Chinese Communist Party (CCP) Xi Jinping touted a "partnership without limits" with Russia and China amplifies Russian propaganda. Two members of the Ukrainian parliament joined the Inter-Parliamentary Union to share concerns about the CCP's undermining of democracy and human rights in the world.

On 30 September 2022, the Ukrainian Foreign Minister Dmytro Kuleba stated that China's current stance on the Russian-Ukrainian war is more beneficial to Ukraine than to Russia.

Trade relations 
The two countries have built a strong trade ties,  specifically since 2008. China has become Ukraine's largest trading partner since 2019, with a trade turnover of 15.4 billion US dollar in 2020, of which Ukraine exports goods worth 7.1 billion US dollar. The total trade turnover increased from 2% of Ukraine's GDP in 2001 to 11% in 2020. The two countries has cooperated closely in term of the military-technical domain and in the space industry, with some famous bilateral projects, such as the Chinese purchase of the Ukrainian aircraft-carrier Varyag in 1998, which later became China's first aircraft carrier Liaoning in 2012. By 2018 Ukraine had replaced the United States as the largest exporter of corn to China, and has begun supplying China with modern jet engines for military craft.

During the 2009 flu pandemic in Ukraine the Chinese government allocated free aid worth a total of 3.5 million yuan ($500,000) to supply diagnostic devices, facemasks, eyeglasses, gloves, and other means of protection for Ukraine. From 2016 to 2021 China's investment in Ukraine rose from $50 million to $260 million. Despite a small share of total foreign direct investment (FDI), 0.5%, their growth rate is significantly ahead of FDI growth in general. Mostly Chinese state-owned companies invest in Ukrainian state-owned companies. Loans are usually also provided by state-owned banks. Chinese companies most primarily work with Ukrainian ones in the energy sector and agriculture.

Twinnings
  Beijing and  Kyiv
  Chongqing and  Zaporizhia
  Jinan and  Kharkiv
  Qingdao and  Odesa
  Suzhou and  Kyiv
  Taiyuan and  Donetsk
  Tianjin and  Kharkiv
  Wuhan and  Kyiv
  Xi'an and  Dnipro
  Xuzhou and  Kropyvnytskyi
  Handan and  Kryvyi Rih
  Suzhou and  Zaporizhia

See also 
 Foreign relations of the People's Republic of China
 Foreign relations of Ukraine
 Chinese embassy in Kyiv
 China - Russia relations

References

External links 
 Chinese Foreign Ministry about relations with Ukraine
 Chinese embassy in Kyiv  (in Chinese, Ukrainian and Russian)
 Ukrainian embassy in Beijing

 
Ukraine 
China, Peoples Republic